The Ives–Stilwell experiment tested the contribution of relativistic time dilation to the Doppler shift of light. The result was in agreement with the formula for the transverse Doppler effect and was the first direct, quantitative confirmation of the time dilation factor. Since then many Ives–Stilwell type experiments have been performed with increased precision. Together with the Michelson–Morley and Kennedy–Thorndike experiments it forms one of the fundamental tests of special relativity theory. Other tests confirming the relativistic Doppler effect are the Mössbauer rotor experiment and modern Ives–Stilwell experiments.

Both time dilation and the relativistic Doppler effect were predicted by Albert Einstein in his seminal 1905 paper.
Einstein subsequently (1907) suggested an experiment based on the measurement of the relative frequencies of light perceived as arriving from a light source in motion with respect to the observer, and he calculated the additional Doppler shift due to time dilation. This effect  was later called "transverse Doppler effect" (TDE), since such experiments were initially imagined to be conducted at right angles with respect to the moving source, in order to avoid the influence of the longitudinal Doppler shift. Eventually, Herbert E. Ives and G. R. Stilwell (referring to time dilation as following from the theory of Lorentz and Larmor) gave up the idea of measuring this effect at right angles. They used rays in longitudinal direction and found a way to separate the much smaller TDE from the much bigger longitudinal Doppler effect. The experiment was performed in 1938 and was reprised several times. Similar experiments were conducted several times with increased precision, for example, by Otting (1939), Mandelberg et al. (1962), Hasselkamp et al. (1979), and Botermann et al.

Experiments with "canal rays"

The experiment of 1938
Ives remarked that it is nearly impossible to measure the transverse Doppler effect with respect to light rays emitted by canal rays at right angles to the direction of motion of the canal rays (as it was considered earlier by Einstein), because the influence of the longitudinal effect can hardly be excluded. Therefore, he developed a method to observe the effect in the longitudinal direction of the canal rays' motion. If it is assumed that the speed of light is fixed with respect to the observer ("classical theory"), then the forward and rearward Doppler-shifted frequencies seen on a moving object will be

 
where v is recession velocity. Under special relativity, the two frequencies will also include an additional Lorentz factor redshift correction represented by the TDE formula

 

 

But if the light is shifted by special relativity's predictions, the additional Lorentz offset means that the two outer marks will be offset in the same direction with respect to the central mark:

 

Ives and Stilwell found that there was a significant offset of the centre of gravity of the three marks, and therefore the Doppler relationship was not that of "classical theory".

This approach had two main advantages: 
It didn't require a commitment to an exact value for the velocity involved (which might have been theory-dependent).
It didn't require an understanding or interpretation of angular aberration effects, as might have been required for the analysis of a "true" transverse test. A "true transverse test" was run almost 40 years later by Hasselkamp in 1979.

The experiment of 1941
In the 1938 experiment, the maximum TDE was limited to 0.047 Å. The chief difficulty that Ives and Stilwell encountered in attempts to achieve larger shifts was that when they raised the electric potential between the accelerating electrodes to above 20,000 volts, breakdown and sparking would occur that could lead to destruction of the tube.

This difficulty was overcome by using multiple electrodes. Using a four-electrode version of the canal ray tube with three gaps, a total potential difference of 43,000 volts could be achieved. A voltage drop of 5,000 volts was used across the first gap, while the remaining voltage drop was distributed between the second and third gaps. With this tube, a highest shift of 0.11 Å was achieved for H2+ ions.

Other aspects of the experiment were also improved. Careful tests showed that the "undisplaced" particles yielding the central line actually acquired a small velocity imparted to them in the same direction of motion as the moving particles (no more than about 750 meters per second). Under normal circumstances, this would be of no consequence, since this effect would only result in a slight apparent broadening of the direct and reflected images of the central line. But if the mirror were tarnished, the central line might be expected to shift slightly. Other controls were performed to address various objections of critics of the original experiment.

The net result of all of this attention to detail was the complete verification of Ives and Stilwell's 1938 results and the extension of these results to higher speeds.

Mössbauer rotor experiments

Relativistic Doppler effect
A more precise confirmation of the relativistic Doppler effect was achieved by the Mössbauer rotor experiments. From a source in the middle of a rotating disk, gamma rays are sent to an absorber at the rim (in some variations this scheme was reversed), and a stationary counter was placed beyond the absorber. According to relativity, the characteristic resonance absorption frequency of the moving absorber at the rim should decrease due to time dilation, so the transmission of gamma rays through the absorber increases, which is subsequently measured by the stationary counter beyond the absorber. This effect was actually observed using the Mössbauer effect. The maximal deviation from time dilation was 10−5, thus the precision was much higher than that (10−2) of the Ives–Stilwell experiments. Such experiments were performed by Hay et al. (1960),
Champeney et al. (1963, 1965), and Kündig (1963).

Isotropy of the speed of light
Mössbauer rotor experiments were also used to measure a possible anisotropy of the speed of light. That is, a possible aether wind should exert a disturbing influence on the absorption frequency. However, as in all other aether drift experiments (Michelson–Morley experiment), the result was negative, putting an upper limit to aether drift of 2.0 cm/s. Experiments of that kind were performed by Champeney & Moon (1961), Champeney et al. (1963), Turner & Hill (1964), and Preikschat supervised by Isaak (1968).

Modern experiments

Fast moving clocks
A considerably higher precision has been achieved in modern variations of Ives–Stilwell experiments. In heavy-ion storage rings, as the TSR at the MPIK or ESR at the GSI Helmholtz Centre for Heavy Ion Research, the Doppler shift of lithium ions traveling at high speed  is evaluated by using saturated spectroscopy or optical–optical double resonance.

Due to their frequencies emitted, these ions can be considered as optical atomic clocks of high precision. Using the framework of Mansouri–Sexl a possible deviation from special relativity can be quantified by
 
In the case of saturation spectroscopy the formula changes to 
 
In the case that special relativity is valid  is equal to zero.

Slow moving clocks
Meanwhile, the measurement of time dilation at everyday speeds has been accomplished as well. Chou et al. (2010) created two clocks each holding a single 27Al+ ion in a Paul trap. In one clock, the Al+ ion was accompanied by a 9Be+ ion as a "logic" ion, while in the other, it was accompanied by a 25Mg+ ion. The two clocks were situated in separate laboratories and connected with a 75 m long, phase-stabilized optical fiber for exchange of clock signals. These optical atomic clocks emitted frequencies in the petahertz (1 PHz = 1015 Hz) range and had frequency uncertainties in the 10−17 range. With these clocks, it was possible to measure a frequency shift due to time dilation of ∼10−16 at speeds below 36 km/h (< 10 m/s, the speed of a fast runner) by comparing the rates of moving and resting aluminum ions. It was also possible to detect gravitational time dilation from a difference in elevation between the two clocks of 33 cm.

See also
 Experimental testing of time dilation 
 Tests of special relativity

References

Further reading
 

Doppler effects
Tests of special relativity
1938 in science